Luciano Albertini (30 November 1882 – 6 January 1945) was an Italian actor, film producer, and film director. After initially appearing in Italian films, he moved to Germany following the First World War. In 1921 he founded a production company Albertini-Film in partnership with Ernst Hugo Correll. During the Weimar era he appeared in a number of silent thriller and adventure films. He starred in films with his wife Linda Albertini.

Partial filmography

Actor
 Spartacus (1913)
 Assunta Spina (1915)
 The Monster of Frankenstein (1920)
 The King of the Circus Ring (1921)
 Julot the Apache (1921)
 Der Mann aus Stahl (1922)
 The Homecoming of Odysseus (1922)
 The Ravine of Death (1923)
 The Maharaja's Victory (1923)
 The Iron Man (1924)
 Mister Radio (1924)
 One Minute to Twelve (1925)
 The Man on the Comet (1925)
 The King and the Girl (1925)
 Lives in Danger (1926)
 Rinaldo Rinaldini (1927)
 The Criminal of the Century (1928)
 The Insurmountable (1928)
 Tempo! Tempo! (1929)
 Arsenal (1929)
 All is at Stake (1932)

Director
 The Man of Steel (1922)
 The Ravine of Death (1923)

Bibliography

External links

1882 births
1945 deaths
Italian male silent film actors
Italian male film actors
People from Lugo, Emilia-Romagna
20th-century Italian male actors
Italian expatriates in Germany